Kövüzbulaq (also, Hovuzbulaq, Gëvuzbulak, Geyuzblakh, and Keyuz-Bulakh) is a village and municipality in the Jalilabad Rayon of Azerbaijan.

References 

Populated places in Jalilabad District (Azerbaijan)